Sartor is a surname. Notable people with the surname include:

David P. Sartor, American composer and conductor
Diane Sartor (born 1970), German skeleton racer
Duran Sartor de Paernas  (fl. c. 1210–50), Provençal troubadour
Frank Sartor (born 1951), Australian politician
Gustavo Collini-Sartor, Argentinian dancer
Jean Oliver Sartor (1918–2007), American artist
Luigi Sartor (born 1975), Italian footballer
Marcos Luciano Sartor Camiña (born 1995), Argentinian footballer 
Marco Sartor (born 1979), Uruguayan guitarist
Ottorino Sartor (1945–2021), Peruvian footballer